Rusk is an unincorporated community located in the town of Red Cedar, Dunn County, Wisconsin, United States. The community was originally named Gates after Milwaukee entrepreneur John L. Gates. In 1905, its name was changed to Rusk after Wisconsin governor Jeremiah M. Rusk.

References

Unincorporated communities in Dunn County, Wisconsin
Unincorporated communities in Wisconsin